The Pennsylvania Department of Corrections (PADOC) is the Pennsylvania state agency that is responsible for the confinement, care and rehabilitation of approximately 37,000 inmates at state correctional facilities funded by the Commonwealth of Pennsylvania. The agency has its headquarters in Hampden Township, Cumberland County in Greater Harrisburg, near Mechanicsburg. In October 2017, Gov. Tom Wolf signed a "memorandum of understanding" that allows the PADOC and the Pennsylvania Board of Probation and Parole to share like resources and eliminate duplicative efforts. All parole supervision now falls under the jurisdiction of the PADOC; while parole release decisions remain under the jurisdiction of the PA Board of Probation and Parole. The two agencies remain separate. With the passage of the 2021-2022 Pennsylvania budget, this merger became official and permanent.

There are currently 23 state correctional institutions, one motivational boot camp, one central training academy, 14 community corrections centers, and the DOC contracts with approximately 40 contractors across the Commonwealth that provide transitional services.  The DOC employs more than 16,000 individuals, and the PADOC's population report is available on its website at www.cor.pa.gov.

History

Pennsylvania has a distinguished reputation in penology. The commonwealth was the birthplace of the penitentiary concept, also known as the Pennsylvania System.  Eastern State Penitentiary opened in 1829 on what was then a cherry orchard outside of Philadelphia. It was considered at the time to be "the world's greatest penitentiary."  Known to historians as "the first true penitentiary," Eastern State operated until 1970.

The Bureau of Correction was created by an act of Legislature in September 1953. The foundation was based on a report by Retired Army Major General Jacob L. Devers, and his special committee to investigate prison problems. The committee was convened shortly after riots at Pittsburgh and Rockview in early 1953. It was the committee's mission to recommend ways to improve the correctional system and reduce unrest.  Up to this point the state's prisons fell under the Department of Welfare.  Here they were governed by their own boards of trustees.  The Devers Committee suggested the establishment of one agency, whose sole purpose was to manage the state prison system.  Appointed by Gov. John S. Fine, Arthur T. Prasse was selected as the first commissioner of corrections, where he remained until 1970.

In 1980, the Bureau of Correction changed hands from the former Pennsylvania Department of Justice, to the newly created Office of General Counsel to the Governor.  Constitutional changes resulted in an elected state attorney general and the disbanding of the Justice Department.

In 1984, under Act 245, the Bureau of Correction was elevated to cabinet-level status, making it the Pennsylvania Department of Corrections.

Institutions
The Department of Corrections maintains 25 institutions across the state as well as the Community Corrections Center, where offenders prepare for re-entry into the community.

The facilities are classified into 4 security levels: Minimum, Medium, Close, and finally Maximum.

Adult Male Institutions
SCI Albion - Medium Security
SCI Benner Township - Medium Security
SCI Camp Hill - Male Diagnostic and Classification Center
SCI Chester - Substance Abuse Treatment Facility
SCI Coal Township - Medium Security
SCI Dallas - Medium Security
SCI Fayette - Maximum Security
SCI Forest - Maximum Security
SCI Frackville - Maximum Security
SCI Greene - Maximum Security, Capital Case Inmates
SCI Houtzdale - Medium Security
SCI Huntingdon - Close Security
SCI Laurel Highlands - Minimum Security
SCI Mahanoy - Medium Security
SCI Mercer - Minimum Security
SCI Pine Grove - Maximum Security
SCI Phoenix - Maximum Security
SCI Rockview - Medium Security
SCI Smithfield - Close Security
SCI Somerset - Medium Security  
SCI Waymart - Psychiatric Care and Treatment Facility and Medium Security

Adult Female Institutions
SCI Cambridge Springs - Minimum Security
SCI Muncy - Female Diagnostic and Classification Center, Capital Case Inmates, Close Security

Co-Ed Boot Camp
Quehanna Boot Camp - Minimum Security Motivational Bootcamp

Death row

Pennsylvania's last execution was carried out in July 1999.

The execution complex for Pennsylvania is on the grounds of the State Correctional Institution – Rockview. Most male death row inmates are housed at the State Correctional Institution – Greene, while some are housed at the State Correctional Institution – Phoenix. While there are no female capital case inmates at this time, any female death row inmates would be housed at the State Correctional Institution – Muncy. Prior to its closure, State Correctional Institution – Graterford housed male death row inmates.

Headquarters
The agency has its headquarters in Hampden Township, Cumberland County in Greater Harrisburg, near Mechanicsburg. The headquarters are located along Technology Parkway in proximity to a residential area.

The agency previously had its headquarters on the grounds of SCI Camp Hill in Lower Allen Township, near Camp Hill, also in Greater Harrisburg. In 2010 the former headquarters were crowded with employees. Construction on the new headquarters started around 2010.

Training academy
The Pennsylvania Department of Corrections Training Academy serves as a training area for prison employees working for the state and county.

The facility was originally the State Hospital for Crippled Children, which opened in 1930. In 1991 the corrections department acquired the facility.

See also

 List of Pennsylvania state agencies
 List of law enforcement agencies in Pennsylvania
 Prison

References

External links
Pennsylvania Department of Corrections
DOC Overview

State corrections departments of the United States
State law enforcement agencies of Pennsylvania
State agencies of Pennsylvania
Government agencies established in 1829
1829 establishments in Pennsylvania